Maricel Álvarez is an Argentine actress. Her film credits include Biutiful, Sunstrokes, To Rome With Love and Un Traductor.

Filmography

1997: Little Miracles
2010: Biutiful
2011: Fatherland
2012: To Rome with Love
2012: The Man of Your Dreams (TV Serie, 1 episode)
2012: Vinyl Days
2013: Paradise for the Damned
2014: Sunstrokes
2015: My Friend from the Park
2017: Vergel
2017: Toublanc
2018: Un traductor
2021: Dusk Stone

External links
 

21st-century Argentine actresses
Argentine film actresses
Living people
Year of birth missing (living people)
Place of birth missing (living people)